The Maestro is a fictional supervillain appearing in American comic books published by Marvel Comics. Created by writer Peter David and artist George Pérez, the character first appeared in The Incredible Hulk: Future Imperfect #1 (Dec. 1992). Depicted as an evil version of the Hulk from an alternate future (designated by Marvel Comics as Earth-9200), the Maestro possesses Bruce Banner's intelligence and the Hulk's strength and more malevolent personality traits.

The Maestro has appeared in video games, and made his animation debut in Hulk and the Agents of S.M.A.S.H., voiced by Fred Tatasciore.

Publication history
The Maestro first appeared as the main antagonist in The Incredible Hulk: Future Imperfect #1-2 (Dec. 1992–Jan. 1993). The character was created by Peter David and George Pérez.

The term maestro is an Italian/Spanish word meaning teacher or master.

Fictional character biography
After a devastating nuclear war destroyed most of the human race, the Hulk and a group of other radiation-empowered heroes were captured by A.I.M. and MODOK with the goal of eventually analysing their physiologies to recreate their immunity to radiation. However, about one hundred years afterwards, the Hulk (now operating in a state where he had Bruce Banner's intelligence) broke out of the VR machine they were using to keep him contained and decided to work on rebuilding the world himself. Travelling to America, he became disheartened with the state of the country, including the destruction of the Hoover Dam and Mount Rushmore, until he found people still alive under Washington. The initial entrance was guarded by the Machine Man, who led the Hulk to the 'Maestro' who ruled this group of survivors, the Hulk swiftly recognising him as Hercules. After Hercules punched the Hulk away just to affirm their old status as sparring partners, Hulk meets with Rick Jones, who explains that Hercules is now only interested in ruling humans and having sparring matches or sex. Although the Hulk expresses little interest in helping ordinary people for the sake of helping them after they caused the apocalypse, when Rick reminds him that most of the people close to Hulk were just normal humans, he infiltrates the remains of Alchemax to create the Dogs of War to oppose Hercules's forces. Hercules entered the fray and fought off the Dogs of War. He then goaded Hulk into a fight and easily bested him, and Hercules spared his life to make him a part of his entourage. Hulk however wanted to make amends, and vanished for a number of years before returning with U-Foes member Vapor, who Hulk had seduce Hercules to get close to him so she could then kill him by poisoning him. Hulk then turned on Vapor by freezing her, shattering her into pieces, and having those pieces buried over a vast area so she could never regenerate. As Hulk tried to publicly cremate Hercules' corpse, he sprung back to life, sent by Hades to enact his revenge. Hercules proved too powerful a physical threat and even the Dogs of War were no challenge for him. When a former member of Rick Jones' rebels unleashed a weapon designed by Forge years previously to kill Hulk, the evil Hulk managed to evade the weapon before his ally the Minister used it to execute Hercules once and for all. Hulk then went to confront Rick about his friends' failed attempt to kill him but found Rick and his artifacts gone. Rick then communicated with Hulk remotely, comparing him to his father, before trying to kill him with a bomb. However, Hulk survived the explosion.

Maestro developed a new movement he called Post-Apocalyptic Existence, or PAX, which would destroy the remaining division in humanity and replace it with a single overlord: himself. Maestro implemented this movement by expanding his domain beyond Dystopia to surrounding areas like Connecticut and the underground community living beneath Washington, D.C., though the community escaped and destroyed their home to spite Maestro. Maestro also joined forces with Doctor Doom to destroy both A.I.M. and Maestro's former team, the Pantheon, as they were the two organizations that remained that threatened their plans to rule the world. When A.I.M. and the Pantheon were vanquished, Maestro and Doom turned on each other, leading to a fight between the two that led to Doom's retreat.

Driven insane by the devastation of everything he has lost, along with the excess radiation he absorbed after the nuclear fallout, the Hulk eventually adopted the title of the new 'Maestro', while gaining even greater strength than before from absorbing the excess radiation after the nuclear holocaust.

An elderly Rick Jones encounters the reality-hopping mutant Proteus, who has possessed the body of an alternate reality Hulk from the year 2099. Proteus intends to discard his current body and possess the Maestro. Jones, unaware of his plan, provides a weapon created by the X-Man Forge, which might be able to kill Maestro. However, the plan fails when the Maestro is warned by the Exiles, who are pursuing Proteus. Proteus possesses a new host and flees to another world, breaking the Maestro's neck during his escape.

Years later, the Maestro (fully recovered from his injury) encounters a time traveling Genis-Vell and Spider-Man from 2099. Manipulated by the supervillain Thanatos, the three battle. Genis-Vell and Spider-Man 2099 eventually return to their own time, with no consequence for the Maestro, when the elderly Rick uses his ability to wield Thor's hammer Mjolnir to defeat Thanatos.

Acquiring Doctor Doom's time machine, the rebels opposing the Maestro bring the Professor Hulk forward from the past, hoping that he can defeat the Maestro. Although Hulk's ability to improvise allows him to score some effective blows against the Maestro, the Maestro's superior strength and experience, combined with his knowledge of the Hulk's strategies, allow him to easily dominate the Hulk and break his neck. Knowing Hulk will soon heal, he shows Hulk around the city, attempting to convince his younger self to side with him, but realizes that the Hulk is pretending to be more injured than he is with the intention of launching an attack. The Maestro is defeated when the Hulk lures him back into the rebel's base—the Maestro throwing Rick Jones into Wolverine's skeleton in the process— subsequently using Doom's time machine to send the Maestro back to the time and place that the Hulk was created: ground zero during the testing of the atomic Gamma Bomb. Appearing next to the bomb itself, Maestro is killed in the same moment that creates the Hulk.

Hulk learns that the "homing sense" that has always allowed him to locate ground zero, his "birth" place, is actually attracted to the Maestro's spirit and remains. The Maestro has been absorbing gamma radiation from the Hulk each time he returns to the site, gradually restoring himself. He emerges, initially in a weakened and emaciated form. The exhausted Maestro attempts to use the Destroyer against the Hulk, but he is driven out when the Hulk manages to transmit his soul into the Destroyer as well, exploiting the fact that the Maestro is still technically him, and forces the Maestro back into his body, which is last seen buried in a small rockslide.

When the Hulk was "upgraded"' to the persona of Doc Green (a version of the Hulk with access to Banner's intellect after being treated with Extremis following being shot in the head), he began to experience dream-like visions of the Maestro while hunting down and 'curing' all other gamma-based mutations, creating the possibility that Doc Green would eventually become his dark future self, starting with him contemplating growing a beard. However, Doc Green eventually recognized the potential dangers of the 'Maestro' aspects of his personality when he realized that part of him enjoyed eliminating his 'rivals', deciding to accept the eventual loss of his intellect as Extremis wore off rather than risk that persona emerging. He leaves the last injection of the cure with She-Hulk, who is the only gamma mutation whose life he felt had been legitimately enhanced by her condition. He instructs her to use it on him if he goes too far.

Variations

A+X version
At some point, the Maestro (or possibly an alternate universe version of him) is sent back in time alongside the "Days of Future Past" version of Wolverine as part of a secret assignment. The two end up battling their present-day Earth-616 counterparts before being forced to flee. They are sent back to an alternate future where Red Hulk is the president of the United States of America, where it is revealed that he sent the two to kill the Earth-616 version of Red Hulk to save the world.

2099 version
When Spider-Man 2099 attempts to return to his own time after the events of Spider-Verse, he ends up in a world accidentally devastated by Alchemax and ruled by the Maestro, who mistakes Miguel for the original Spider-Man. The Maestro beats Miguel into submission, and places him in a cell with Strange 2099. The Maestro then travels back to present day by having the demon possessing Strange manipulate Miguel into repairing Doctor Doom's Time Platform. The Maestro timeline is described by Miguel O'Hara as having overwritten the 2099 timeline he originated from. Miguel seemingly manages to slay the Maestro with a weapon from the villain's trophy room, but it is later shown that the Maestro feigned defeat to follow Miguel back to the present.

King
A Maestro from an unidentified alternate reality arrived in the Old Man Logan reality where he rounded up the surviving members of the Hulk Gang as he makes plans to help them build a paradise for all Hulks on Earth-616. With help from Cambria Banner, Logan and Hawkeye of Earth-616 were able to defeat Maestro and the surviving members of the Hulk Gang went their separate ways.

Later on, it is revealed Maestro recovered from his wounds and went on to conquer a small town in Northern Canada called Fort Wells, ruling as "the King" and executing anyone who defies him. Logan eventually tracks him down, and after injecting himself with the dangerous regenerative drug Regenix, cuts Maestro's head off, ending his reign of terror.

Battleworld Maestro
After Doctor Doom incorporates the "Future Imperfect" timeline into his new Battleworld as seen in the Secret Wars, the Maestro resurfaces as the ruler of one of the planet's domains called Dystopia. He poses as a depowered Odin to gain the trust of the resistance movement, and confronts the resistance's leader Thunderbolt Ross (this reality's version of Thing). After a brutal fight, the Maestro offers to release Dystopia from his tyrannical rule if Ross can help him kill God Emperor Doom. To this end, the Maestro sets out to find the Destroyer in another zone of Battleworld. Although he tracks it to a region of Asgardia where it is guarded by Ulik, he is shocked to learn that its final line of defense is the 'Ancient One'... an elderly Rick Jones. After merging with the Destroyer, the Maestro kills God Emperor Doom and conquers Battleworld. However, it is revealed that the entire battle was an illusion that has ensnared Maestro. Believing himself to be victorious, Maestro reverts to his human form, with Rick stating that he'll now remain trapped in the illusion until he eventually withers and dies. Maestro was eventually released from the illusion he was trapped on by God Emperor Doom and is seen helping him against the riots in Doomstadt.

Eight months later as part of Marvel's All-New, All-Different Marvel branding, the Maestro is seen working for the Collector as his "Summoner" in the new Contest of Champions. The Collector apparently saved the Maestro from his fate and feels the villain owes him his life as a result, though the Maestro is less than grateful. He is seen scheming to find a way to kill the Collector and escape his servitude. After assuming control of the Power Primordial contained within the Iso-Sphere that the Grandmaster and Collector were competing for, Maestro recreates Battleworld since he had previously vowed that he would become the God-King of Battleworld. The Maestro is ultimately thwarted when Outlaw, one of the heroes who had previously been captured and forced to fight, destroys the Iso-Sphere. An outraged Maestro later awakens to find himself as a captive in the Collector's display room.

Powers and abilities
The Maestro largely shared the same powers as the Hulk, but a greater degree than most incarnations due to the century's worth of radiation he has absorbed resulting in these nuclear wars that decimated his Earth (the present day Hulk speculated that his insanity might also contribute to this higher strength). This includes certain mental powers, such as the Hulk's ability to see and interact with astral forms shown in The Defenders series. Although he possesses Banner's intellect, the Maestro has rarely demonstrated his technical expertise and implies to have built Dystopia himself. At one point, he manipulated Miguel O'Hara into repairing a time machine for him, rather than doing it himself.

Collected editions

In other media

Television
The Maestro appears in the Hulk and the Agents of S.M.A.S.H. episode "Enter the Maestro", voiced by Fred Tatasciore. This version is the result of the Hulk being exposed to excess radiation from a gamma meteor, which increased his power but drove him insane and eventually turned him into the Maestro. Going by the nickname "Old Man Hulk", he travels back in time ostensibly to help his past self and the Agents of S.M.A.S.H. stop a gamma meteor from hitting Earth while secretly working to preserve his existence and future. However, A-Bomb's future self also traveled back in time to warn the Agents of S.M.A.S.H. of the Maestro's plot. With the Agents' help, the future A-Bomb cures the Hulk, changing the future and causing himself and the Maestro to fade from existence.

Video games
 The Maestro appears as an unlockable alternate skin for the Hulk in The Incredible Hulk, Avengers Initiative, and Marvel Heroes.
 The Maestro appears in The Incredible Hulk: The Pantheon Saga.
 Two incarnations of the Maestro appear in Marvel Contest of Champions. One version is a boss who utilizes his own "Iron Hulk" armor equipped with Magik's Soulsword and Ronan the Accuser's Universal Weapon while a younger version called the Overseer appears as a playable character who utilizes the Silver Surfer's board and the Cosmic Cube. 
 The Maestro appears in Lego Marvel Super Heroes 2. This version is a member of the World Breakers.
 The Maestro appears in Marvel Realm of Champions. This version created and ruled over Battleworld until he was mysteriously slain, causing the Barons to rise up and take control of their lands.
 The Maestro appears in the Marvel's Avengers DLC story expansion "Operation: Hawkeye - Future Imperfect", voiced by Darin De Paul. This version is from a future in which the Kree invaded the Earth. Following a nuclear war in the following years, he absorbed excess radiation from the nuclear fallout, making him more powerful while his mental health deteriorated. Eventually driven mad with power, he set out to conquer much of the former United States as the "Supreme Leader". At some point during his reign, the Maestro killed most of the Avengers and came to control a large army of A.I.M. robots to wage war on surviving S.H.I.E.L.D. operatives. The Maestro tries to stop past versions of the Avengers who traveled to the future to learn what led to the end of humanity and try to prevent it. However, the Maestro is ultimately defeated by Avengers with the help of a future version of Hawkeye.
 The Maestro appears in Marvel Future Revolution, voiced again by Fred Tatasciore.

Merchandise
The Maestro received a figure in the Marvel Legends line.

Miscellaneous
An alternate timeline incarnation of the Maestro appears in Hulk: What Savage Beast, by Peter David.

See also
 Alternative versions of the Hulk

References

Characters created by Peter David
Characters created by George Pérez
Comics characters introduced in 1992
Fictional characters with immortality
Fictional characters with superhuman durability or invulnerability
Fictional emperors and empresses
Fictional kings
Fictional mass murderers
Fictional mad scientists
Fictional nuclear physicists
Fictional physicians
Fictional warlords
Hulk (comics)
Marvel Comics characters with accelerated healing
Marvel Comics characters who are shapeshifters
Marvel Comics characters who can move at superhuman speeds
Marvel Comics characters with superhuman strength
Marvel Comics male supervillains
Marvel Comics mutates
Marvel Comics scientists
Time travelers